An Ogiso is referred to by the people of the kingdom of Benin as king of the sky. This is a list of the independent Ogisos (Kings) of Igodomigodo, which was to become the Benin Empire, from 40 BCE to 1100 CE. The dating is based on the recollection made by Daryl Peavy of the oral traditions of the Edo people. The Ogiso were assisted by seven nobles called the Uzama'. During the reign of Ogisos, Edo lands were called 'Igodomigodo' and they had administrative centers or capitals at Ubinu which was later called Benin City. Community autonomy was given to each community by the Ogiso during their reign.

References

External links
 edo-nation.net

Edo people
History of Nigeria
Ogiso
Ogiso
Kingdom of Benin